Greg Whitecross (born 15 March 1961) is a former professional tennis player from Australia.

Junior career
Whitecross was the boys' singles champion at the 1979 Australian Open, defeating Craig Miller in the final. He won the doubles title as well, with Michael Fancutt.

In 1979, he was also a quarter-finalist in the French Open and made the round of 16 at Wimbledon.

Professional career
Whitecross competed in the main singles draw at the Australian Open six times, without ever making it past the opening round. The closest he came was in the 1982 Australian Open when he lost to Damir Keretić in five sets, after claiming the first two. He also appeared at least once at the other three Grand Slam tournaments, playing in the 1980 US Open (beaten by Víctor Pecci), the 1980 Wimbledon Championships (in the men's doubles), the 1982 Wimbledon Championships (lost to Eddie Edwards), the 1984 Wimbledon Championships (in the mixed doubles), and the 1984 French Open (in the men's doubles).

On the Grand Prix circuit, Whitecross had his best performances at the South Australian Open. In 1982, he had wins over Mike Leach and Jeff Borowiak, before exiting at the quarter-final stage, to Broderick Dyke. At the South Australian Open the following year, he made the doubles semi-finals, with partner Mark Lewis.

Challenger titles

Singles: (1)

Doubles: (1)

References

1961 births
Living people
Australian male tennis players
Australian Open (tennis) junior champions
Tennis players from Melbourne
Grand Slam (tennis) champions in boys' singles
Grand Slam (tennis) champions in boys' doubles